A land value tax (LVT) is a levy on the value of land without regard to buildings, personal property and other improvements. It is also known as a location value tax, a point valuation tax, a site valuation tax, split rate tax, or a site-value rating.

Land value taxes are generally favored by economists as they do not cause economic inefficiency, and reduce inequality. A land value tax is a progressive tax, in that the tax burden falls on land owners, because land ownership  is correlated with wealth and income. The land value tax has been referred to as "the perfect tax" and the economic efficiency of a land value tax has been accepted since the eighteenth century. Economists since Adam Smith and David Ricardo have advocated this tax because it does not hurt economic activity or discourage or subsidize development.

LVT is associated with Henry George, whose ideology became known as Georgism. George argued that taxing the land value is most logical source of public revenue because the supply of land is fixed and because public infrastructure improvements would be reflected in (and thus paid for by) increased land values.

Land value taxation is currently implemented throughout Denmark, Estonia, Lithuania, Russia, Singapore, and Taiwan; it has also been applied to lesser extents in parts of Australia, Mexico (Mexicali), and the United States (e.g., Pennsylvania).

Economic properties

Efficiency

Most taxes distort economic decisions and discourage beneficial economic activity. For example, property taxes discourage construction, maintenance, and repair because taxes increase with improvements. LVT is not based on how land is used. Because the supply of land is essentially fixed, land rents depend on what tenants are prepared to pay, rather than on landlord expenses. Thus landlords cannot pass LVT to tenants, who would move or rent smaller spaces before absorbing increased rent.

The land's occupants benefit from improvements surrounding a site. Such improvements shift tenants' demand curve to the right (they will pay more). Landlords benefit from price competition among tenants; the only direct effect of LVT in this case is to reduce the amount of social benefit that is privately captured as land price by titleholders.

LVT is said to be justified for economic reasons because it does not deter production, distort markets, or otherwise create deadweight loss. Land value tax can even have negative deadweight loss (social benefits), particularly when land use improves. Nobel Prize-winner William Vickrey believed that 

LVT's efficiency has been observed in practice. Fred Foldvary stated that LVT discourages speculative land holding because the tax reflects changes in land value (up and down), encouraging landowners to develop or sell vacant/underused plots in high demand. Foldvary claimed that LVT increases investment in dilapidated inner city areas because improvements don't cause tax increases. This in turn reduces the incentive to build on remote sites and so reduces urban sprawl. For example, Harrisburg, Pennsylvania's LVT has operated since 1975. This policy was credited by mayor Stephen R. Reed with reducing the number of vacant downtown structures from around 4,200 in 1982 to fewer than 500.

LVT is arguably an ecotax because it discourages the waste of prime locations, which are a finite resource. Many urban planners claim that LVT is an effective method to promote transit-oriented development.

Real estate values
The value of land reflects the value it can provide over time. This value can be measured by the ground rent that a piece of land receives on the market. The present value of ground-rent is the basis for land prices. A land value tax (LVT) will reduce the ground rent received by the landlord, and thus will decrease the price of land, holding all else constant. The rent charged for land may also decrease as a result of efficiency gains if speculators stop hoarding unused land.

Real estate bubbles direct savings towards rent seeking activities rather than other investments and can contribute to recessions. Advocates claim that LVT reduces the speculative element in land pricing, thereby leaving more money for productive capital investment.

At sufficiently high levels, LVT would cause real estate prices to fall by taxing away land rents that would otherwise become 'capitalized' into the price of real estate. It also encourages landowners to sell or develop locations that they are not using. This might cause some landowners, especially pure landowners, to resist high land value tax rates. Landowners often possess significant political influence, which may help explain the limited spread of land value taxes so far.

Tax incidence
A land value tax has progressive tax effects, in that it is paid by the owners of valuable land who tend to be the rich, and since the amount of land is fixed, the tax burden cannot be passed on as higher rents or lower wages to tenants, consumers or workers.

Practical issues
Several practical issues complicate LVT implementation. Most notably, it must be:
 Calculated fairly and accurately
 High enough to raise sufficient revenue without causing land abandonment, but if land is abandoned, it could be claimed by the State (as occurs in Israel),
 Billed to the correct person or business entity

Assessment/appraisal

Levying an LVT requires an assessment and a title register. In a 1796 United States Supreme Court opinion, Justice William Paterson said that leaving the valuation process up to assessors would cause bureaucratic complexities, as well as non-uniform procedures. Murray Rothbard later raised similar concerns, claiming that no government can fairly assess value, which can only be determined by a free market.

Compared to modern property tax assessments, land valuations involve fewer variables and have smoother gradients than valuations that include improvements. This is due to variation of building design and quality. Modern statistical techniques have improved the process; in the 1960s and 1970s, multivariate analysis was introduced as an assessment tool. Usually, such a valuation process commences with a measurement of the most and least valuable land within the taxation area. A few sites of intermediate value are then identified and used as "landmark" values. Other values are interpolated between the landmark values. The data is then collated in a database, "smoothed" and mapped using a geographic information system (GIS). Thus, even if the initial valuation is difficult, once the system is in use, successive valuations become easier.

Revenue
 In the context of LVT as a single tax (replacing all other taxes), some have argued that LVT alone cannot raise enough tax revenue. However, the presence of other taxes can reduce land values and hence the revenue that can be raised from them. The Physiocrats argued that all other taxes ultimately come at the expense of land rental values. Most modern LVT systems function alongside other taxes and thus only reduce their impact without removing them. Land taxes that are higher than the rental surplus (the full land rent for that time period) would result in land abandonment.

Title
In some countries, LVT is impractical because of uncertainty regarding land titles and tenure. For instance a parcel of grazing land may be communally owned by village inhabitants and administered by village elders. The land in question would need to be held in a trust or similar body for taxation purposes. If the government cannot accurately define ownership boundaries and ascertain the proper owners, it cannot know from whom to collect the tax. Clear titles are absent in many developing countries. In African countries with imperfect land registration, boundaries may be poorly surveyed and the owner can be unknown.

Incentives

Speculation 

The owner of a vacant lot in a thriving city must still pay a tax and would rationally perceive the property as a financial liability, encouraging them to put the land to use in order to cover the tax. LVT removes financial incentives to hold unused land solely for price appreciation, making more land available for productive uses. Land value tax creates an incentive to convert these sites to more intensive private uses or into public purposes.

Incidence 
The selling price of a good that is fixed in supply, such as land, does not change if it is taxed. By contrast, the price of manufactured goods can rise in response to increased taxes, because the higher cost reduces the number of units that suppliers are willing to sell at the original price. The price increase is how the maker passes along some part of the tax to consumers. However, if the revenue from LVT is used to reduce other taxes or to provide valuable public investment, it can cause land prices to rise as a result of higher productivity, by more than the amount that LVT removed.

Land tax incidence rests completely upon landlords, although business sectors that provide services to landlords are indirectly impacted. In some economies, 80 percent of bank lending finances real estate, with a large portion of that for land. Reduced demand for land speculation might reduce the amount of circulating bank credit.

While land owners are unlikely to be able to charge higher rents to compensate for LVT, removing other taxes may increase rents, as this may affect the demand for land.

Land use 

Assuming constant demand, an increase in constructed space decreases the cost of improvements to land such as houses. Shifting property taxes from improvements to land encourages development. Infill of underutilized urban space is one common practice to reduce urban sprawl.

Collection 
LVT is less vulnerable to tax evasion, since land cannot be concealed or moved overseas and titles are easily identified, as they are registered with the public. Land value assessments are usually considered public information, which is available upon request. Transparency reduces tax evasion.

Ethics

Land acquires a scarcity value owing to the competing needs for space. The value of land generally owes nothing to the landowner and everything to the surroundings.

Religion 
It has been claimed that land is God's gift to mankind. For example, the Catholic Church asserts in its 1967 "universal destination of goods" principle:

In addition, the Church maintains that civil authorities have the right and duty to regulate the legitimate exercise of the right to ownership for the sake of the common good, including the right to tax.

Equity

LVT considers the effect on land value of location, and of improvements made to neighbouring land, such as proximity to roads and public works. LVT is the purest implementation of the public finance principle known as value capture.

A public works project can increase land values and thus increase LVT revenues. Arguably, public improvements should be paid for by the landowners who benefit from them. Thus, LVT captures the land value of socially created wealth, allowing a reduction in tax on privately created (non-land) wealth.

LVT generally is a progressive tax, with those of greater means paying more, in that land ownership correlates to income and landlords cannot shift the tax burden onto tenants. LVT generally reduces economic inequality, removes incentives to misuse real estate, and reduces the vulnerability of economies to property booms and crashes.

History

Pre-modern
Land value taxation began after the introduction of agriculture. It was originally based on crop yield. This early version of the tax required simply sharing the yield at the time of the harvest, on a yearly basis.

Rishis of ancient India claimed that land should be held in common and that unfarmed land should produce the same tax as productive land. "The earth ...is common to all beings enjoying the fruit of their own labour; it belongs...to all alike"; therefore, "there should be left some for everyone". Apastamba said "If any person holding land does not exert himself and hence bears no produce, he shall, if rich, be made to pay what ought to have been produced".

Mencius was a Chinese philosopher (around 300 BCE) who advocated for the elimination of taxes and tariffs, to be replaced by the public collection of urban land rent: "In the market-places, charge land-rent, but don't tax the goods."

During the Middle Ages, in the West, the first regular and permanent land tax system was based on a unit of land known as the hide. The hide was originally the amount of land sufficient to support a household. It later became subject to a land tax known as "geld".

Physiocrats

The physiocrats were a group of economists who believed that the wealth of nations was derived solely from the value of land agriculture or land development. Before the Industrial Revolution, this was approximately correct. Physiocracy is one of the "early modern" schools of economics. Physiocrats called for the abolition of all existing taxes, completely free trade and a single tax on land. They did not distinguish between the intrinsic value of land and ground rent. Their theories originated in France and were most popular during the second half of the 18th century. The movement was particularly dominated by Anne Robert Jacques Turgot (1727–1781) and François Quesnay (1694–1774). It influenced contemporary statesmen, such as Charles Alexandre de Calonne. The physiocrats were highly influential in the early history of land value taxation in the United States.

Radical Movement
A participant in the Radical Movement, Thomas Paine contended in his Agrarian Justice pamphlet that all citizens should be paid 15 pounds at age 21 "as a compensation in part for the loss of his or her natural inheritance by the introduction of the system of landed property." "Men did not make the earth. It is the value of the improvements only, and not the earth itself, that is individual property. Every proprietor owes to the community a ground rent for the land which he holds." This proposal was the origin of the citizen's dividend advocated by Geolibertarianism. Thomas Spence advocated a similar proposal except that the land rent would be distributed equally each year regardless of age.

Classical economists

Adam Smith, in his 1776 book The Wealth of Nations, first rigorously analyzed the effects of a land value tax, pointing out how it would not hurt economic activity, and how it would not raise contract rents.

Henry George 

Henry George (2 September 1839 – 29 October 1897) was perhaps the most famous advocate of recovering land rents for public purposes. An American journalist, politician and political economist, he advocated a "single tax" on land that would eliminate the need for all other taxes. George first articulated the proposal in Our Land and Land Policy (1871). Later, in his best-selling work Progress and Poverty (1879), George argued that because the value of land depends on natural qualities combined with the economic activity of communities, including public investments, the economic rent of land was the best source of tax revenue. This book significantly influenced land taxation in the United States and other countries, including Denmark, which continues grundskyld ('ground duty') as a key component of its tax system. The philosophy that natural resource rents should be captured by society is now often known as Georgism. Its relevance to public finance is underpinned by the Henry George theorem.

Meiji Restoration
After the 1868 Meiji Restoration in Japan, land tax reform was undertaken. An LVT was implemented beginning in 1873. By 1880 initial problems with valuation and rural opposition had been overcome and rapid industrialisation began.

Liberal and Labour Parties in the United Kingdom
In the United Kingdom, LVT was an important part of the platform of the Liberal Party during the early part of the twentieth century. David Lloyd George and H. H. Asquith proposed "to free the land that from this very hour is shackled with the chains of feudalism." It was also advocated by Winston Churchill early in his career. The modern Liberal Party (not to be confused with the Liberal Democrats, who are the heir to the earlier Liberal Party and who offer some support for the idea) remains committed to a local form of LVT, as do the Green Party of England and Wales and the Scottish Greens.

The 1931 Labour budget included an LVT, but before it came into force it was repealed by the Conservative-dominated national government that followed.

An attempt at introducing LVT in the administrative County of London was made by the local authority under the leadership of Herbert Morrison in the 1938–1939 Parliament, called the London Rating (Site Values) Bill. Although it failed, it detailed legislation for the implementation of a system of LVT using annual value assessment.

After 1945, the Labour Party adopted the policy, against substantial opposition, of collecting "development value": the increase in land price arising from planning consent. This was one of the provisions of the Town and Country Planning Act 1947, but it was repealed when the Labour government lost power in 1951.

Senior Labour figures in recent times have advocated an LVT, notably Andy Burnham in his 2010 leadership campaign, former Leader of the Opposition Jeremy Corbyn, and Shadow Chancellor John McDonnell.

Republic of China
The Republic of China was one of the first jurisdictions to implement an LVT, specified in its constitution. Sun Yat-Sen would learn about LVT from the Kiautschou Bay concession, which had successful implementation of LVT, bringing increased wealth and financial stability to the colony. The Republic of China would go on to implement LVT in farms at first, later implementing it in the urban areas due to its success.

Modern economists

Alfred Marshall argued in favour of a "fresh air rate", a tax to be charged to urban landowners and levied on that value of urban land that is caused by the concentration of population. That general rate should have to be spent on breaking out small green spots in the midst of dense industrial districts, and on the preservation of large green areas between different towns and between different suburbs which are tending to coalesce. This idea influenced Marshall's pupil Arthur Pigou's ideas on taxing negative externalities.

Pigou wrote an essay supporting LVT, interpreted as support for Lloyd George's People's Budget.

Paul Samuelson supported LVT. "Our ideal society finds it essential to put a rent on land as a way of maximizing the total consumption available to the society. ...Pure land rent is in the nature of a 'surplus' which can be taxed heavily without distorting production incentives or efficiency. A land value tax can be called 'the useful tax on measured land surplus'."

Milton Friedman stated: "There's a sense in which all taxes are antagonistic to free enterprise – and yet we need taxes. ...So the question is, which are the least bad taxes? In my opinion the least bad tax is the property tax on the unimproved value of land, the Henry George argument of many, many years ago."

Michael Hudson is a proponent for taxing rent, especially land rent. ".... politically, taxing economic rent has become the bête noire of neoliberal globalism. It is what property owners and rentiers fear most of all, as land, subsoil resources and natural monopolies far exceed industrial capital in magnitude. What appears in the statistics at first glance as 'profit' turns out upon examination to be Ricardian or 'economic' rent."

Paul Krugman agreed that LVT is efficient, however he disputed whether it should be considered a single tax, as he believed it would not be enough alone, excluding taxes on natural resource rents and other Georgist taxes, to fund a welfare state. "Believe it or not, urban economics models actually do suggest that Georgist taxation would be the right approach at least to finance city growth. But I would just say: I don't think you can raise nearly enough money to run a modern welfare state by taxing land [only]."

Joseph Stiglitz, articulating the Henry George theorem wrote that, "Not only was Henry George correct that a tax on land is nondistortionary, but in an equilitarian society ... tax on land raises just enough revenue to finance the (optimally chosen) level of government expenditure."

Rick Falkvinge proposed a "simplified taxless state" where the state owns all the land it can defend from other states, and leases this land to people at market rates.

Implementation

Australia

Land taxes in Australia are levied by the states. The exemption thresholds vary, as do tax rates and other rules.

In New South Wales, the state land tax exempts farmland and principal residences and there is a tax threshold. Determination of land value for tax purposes is the responsibility of the Valuer-General. The principal residence, primary production land and land used by a charity are exempt from land tax. Between  and  the tax rate is 0.55% and over  it is 1.5%.

By revenue, property taxes represent 4.5% of total taxation in Australia. A government report in 1986 for Brisbane, Queensland advocated an LVT.

The Henry Tax Review of 2010 commissioned by the federal government recommended that state governments replace stamp duty with LVT. The review proposed multiple marginal rates and that most agricultural land would be in the lowest band with a rate of zero. The Australian Capital Territory moved to adopt this system and planned to reduce stamp duty by 5% and raise land tax by 5% for each of twenty years.

Canada
LVT were common in Western Canada at the turn of the twentieth century. In Vancouver LVT became the sole form of municipal taxation in 1910 under the leadership of mayor, Louis D. Taylor. Gary B. Nixon (2000) stated that the rate never exceeded 2% of land value, too low to prevent the speculation that led directly to the 1913 real estate crash. All Canadian provinces later taxed improvements.

Estonia
Estonia levies an LVT to fund municipalities. It is a state level tax, but 100% of the revenue funds Local Councils. The rate is set by the Local Council within the limits of 0.1–2.5%. It is one of the most important sources of funding for municipalities. LVT is levied on the value of the land only. Few exemptions are available and even public institutions are subject to it. Church sites are exempt, but other land held by religious institutions is not. The tax has contributed to a high rate (~90%) of owner-occupied residences within Estonia, compared to a rate of 67.4% in the United States.

Hong Kong
Government rent in Hong Kong, formerly the crown rent, is levied in addition to Rates. Properties located in the New Territories (including New Kowloon), or located in the rest of the territory and whose land grant was recorded after 27 May 1985, pay 3% of the rateable rental value.

Hungary
Municipal governments in Hungary levy an LVT based on the area or the land's adjusted market value. The maximum rate is 3% of the adjusted market value.

Kenya
Kenya's LVT history dates to at least 1972, shortly after it achieved independence. Local governments must tax land value, but are required to seek approval from the central government for rates that exceed 4 percent. Buildings were not taxed in Kenya as of 2000. The central government is legally required to pay municipalities for the value of land it occupies. Kelly claimed that possibly as a result of this land reform, Kenya became the only stable country in its region. As of late 2014, the city of Nairobi still taxed only land values, although a tax on improvements had been proposed.

Mexico
The capital city of Baja California, Mexicali, has had an LVT since the 1990s when it became the first locality in Mexico to implement such a tax.

Namibia
A land value taxation on rural land was introduced in Namibia, with the primary intention of improving land use.

Russia
In 1990, several economists wrote to then President Mikhail Gorbachev suggesting that Russia adopt LVT; its failure to do so was argued as causal in the rise of oligarchs.
Currently, Russia has an LVT of 0.3% on residential, agricultural and utilities lands as well as a 1.5% tax for other types of land.

Singapore
Singapore owns the majority of its land which it leases for 99-year terms. In addition, Singapore taxes development uplift at around 70%. These two sources of revenue fund most of Singapore's new infrastructure.

South Korea
South Korea has an aggregate land tax that is levied annually based on an individual's landholding value across the whole country. Speculative and residential land has a progressive tax rate of 0.2–5%, commercial and building sites 0.3–2%, farm and forest lands 0.1% and luxury properties 5%.

Spain

Taiwan
As of 2010, land value taxes and land value increment taxes accounted for 8.4% of total government revenue in Taiwan.

Thailand
The Thai government introduced the Land and Building Tax Act B.E. 2562 in March 2019, which came into effect on 1 January 2020. It sets a maximum tax rate of 1.2% on commercial and vacant land, 0.3% for residential land and 0.15% for agricultural land.

United States

In the late 19th century George's followers founded a single tax colony at Fairhope, Alabama. Although the colony, now a nonprofit corporation, still holds land in the area and collects a relatively small ground rent, the land is subject to state and local property taxes.

Common property taxes include land value, which usually has a separate assessment. Thus, land value taxation already exists in many jurisdictions. Some jurisdictions have attempted to rely more heavily on it. In Pennsylvania certain cities raised the tax on land value while reducing the tax on improvement/building/structure values. For example, the city of Altoona adopted a property tax that solely taxes land value in 2002 but repealed the tax in 2016. Many Pennsylvania cities use a split-rate tax, which taxes the value of land at a higher rate than the value of buildings.

Countries with active discussion

China
China's Real Rights Law contains provisions founded on LVT analysis.

Ireland

In 2010 the government of Ireland announced that it would introduce an LVT, beginning in 2013. Following a 2011 change in government, a property tax was introduced instead.

New Zealand
After decades of a modest LVT, New Zealand abolished it in 1990. Discussions continue as to whether or not to bring it back. Earlier Georgist politicians included Patrick O'Regan and Tom Paul (who was Vice-President of the New Zealand Land Values League).

United Kingdom

In September 1908, Chancellor of the Exchequer David Lloyd George instructed McKenna, the First Lord of the Admiralty, to build more Dreadnoughts. The ships were to be financed by an LVT. Lloyd George believed that relating national defence to land tax would both provoke the opposition of the House of Lords and rally the people round a simple emotive issue. The Lords, composed of wealthy land owners, rejected the Budget in November 1909, leading to a constitutional crisis.

LVT was on the UK statute books briefly in 1931, introduced by Philip Snowden's 1931 budget, strongly supported by prominent LVT campaigner Andrew MacLaren MP. MacLaren lost his seat at the next election (1931) and the act was repealed, MacLaren tried again with a private member's bill in 1937; it was rejected 141 to 118.

Labour Land Campaign advocates within the Labour Party and the broader labour movement for "a more equitable distribution of the Land Values that are created by the whole community" through LVT. Its membership includes members of the British Labour Party, Trade Unions and Cooperatives and individuals. The Liberal Democrats' ALTER (Action for Land Taxation and Economic Reform) aims

The Green Party "favour moving to a system of Land Value Tax, where the level of taxation depends on the rental value of the land concerned."

A course in "Economics with Justice" with a strong foundation in LVT are offered at the School of Economic Science, which was founded by Andrew MacLaren MP and has historical links with the Henry George Foundation.

Scotland

In February 1998, the Scottish Office of the British Government launched a public consultation process on land reform. A survey of the public response found that: "excluding the responses of the lairds and their agents, reckoned as likely prejudiced against the measure, 20% of all responses favoured the land tax" (12% in grand total, without the exclusions). The government responded by announcing "a comprehensive economic evaluation of the possible impact of moving to a land value taxation basis". However, no measure was adopted.

In 2000 the Parliament's Local Government Committee's inquiry into local government finance explicitly included LVT, but the final report omitted any mention.

In 2003 the Scottish Parliament passed a resolution: "That the Parliament notes recent studies by the Scottish Executive and is interested in building on them by considering and investigating the contribution that land value taxation could make to the cultural, economic, environmental and democratic renaissance of Scotland."

In 2004 a letter of support was sent from members of the Scottish Parliament to the organisers and delegates of the IU's 24th international conference—including members of the Scottish Greens, the Scottish Socialist Party and the Scottish National Party.

The policy was considered in the 2006 Scottish Local Government Finance Review whose 2007 Report concluded that "although land value taxation meets a number of our criteria, we question whether the public would accept the upheaval involved in radical reform of this nature, unless they could clearly understand the nature of the change and the benefits involved.... We considered at length the many positive features of a land value tax which are consistent with our recommended local property tax [LPT], particularly its progressive nature." However, "[h]aving considered both rateable value and land value as the basis for taxation, we concur with Layfield (UK Committee of Inquiry, 1976) who recommended that any local property tax should be based on capital values."

In 2009, Glasgow City Council resolved to introduce LVT by saying "the idea could become the blueprint for Scotland's future local taxation". The Council agreed to a "long term move to a local property tax / land value tax hybrid tax". Its Local Taxation Working Group stated that simple [non-hybrid] land value taxation should itself "not be discounted as an option for local taxation reform: it potentially holds many benefits and addresses many existing concerns".

Zimbabwe
In Zimbabwe, government coalition partners the Movement for Democratic Change adopted LVT.

Belgium 
Bernard Clerfayt called for the overhaul of the property tax in the Brussels region, with a higher tax for land values than for buildings.

Tax rates

EU countries

See also

 Citizen's dividend
 Classical economics
 Danegeld
 Earth Rights Institute
 Ecotax
 Equity in taxation
 Geographic information system
 Geolibertarianism
 Georgism
 International Union for Land Value Taxation (The IU)
 Land (economics)
 Land monopolization and reform
 Land speculation
 Land tenure and registration
 Law of rent
 Lockean proviso
 Natural resource economics
 Open letter to Gorbachev
 Optimal tax
 Physiocracy
 Pigovian tax
 Progressive tax
 Property rights (economics)
 Property Tax
 Prosper Australia
 Rent-seeking
 Scottish League for the Taxation of Land Values
 Single tax
 Tax reform
 Tax shift
 Value capture
 Wealth tax

References

Notes

Sources

Further reading

External sources
 New South Wales Land Tax Management Act 1956 (Australia)

 
Land taxation
Georgism
Real estate valuation
Tax reform
Valuation (finance)